Sierra Dawn Hull (born September 27, 1991) is an American bluegrass singer-songwriter, mandolinist, and guitarist.

Hull was signed to Rounder Records at the age of 13 and released her debut vocal album, Secrets, in 2008 at the age of 16. The album peaked at No. 2 on the Billboard Top Bluegrass Albums chart. Her second album, Daybreak, was released on March 8, 2011.

Early life and career
Sierra Hull was born and raised in Byrdstown, Tennessee and attended Pickett County High School before accepting a Presidential Scholarship to study at the Berklee College of Music.

Hull began playing the mandolin at the age of eight and put out the album Angel Mountain at 10. She was soon playing jam sessions with other musicians in her family, and by 2001 she was entering local talent contests. Her parents, Stacy and Brenda Hull, took her to numerous bluegrass festivals and it was during an International Bluegrass Music Association festival that she came to the attention of Rounder Records chief talent scout Ken Irwin. At age 11 she was mentored and befriended by Alison Krauss, herself once a child prodigy on the fiddle. Hull and Krauss, along with Dan Tyminski, performed at the White House on November 21, 2011.

She has a brother, Cody, and is a distant cousin of former United States Secretary of State Cordell Hull.
Hull has already received five International Bluegrass Music Association nominations in the past three years.

Hull received the Bluegrass Star Award, presented by the Bluegrass Heritage Foundation, on October 19, 2013.  The award is bestowed upon bluegrass artists who do an exemplary job of advancing traditional bluegrass music and bringing it to new audiences while preserving its character and heritage.

Touring
Hull performed with the band Highway 111 at the Gettysburg Bluegrass festival in 2005. She continued to tour, even while she attended Berklee College of Music.

Hull has also recorded and toured with Cory Wong, featured as a supporting act and collaborative partner on a 2022 tour.

Recordings

Secrets
Hull's vocal debut album on Rounder Records, released in May 2008, was co-produced by Alison Krauss and Ron Block which follows a self-released CD Angel Mountain, in 2002. The production by Hull and Ron Block paid tribute and honored the tradition and style of bluegrass music. The album contained 3 original songs penned by Hull. She was just 15 when she recorded the album and 16 when it was released.

Daybreak
On her 2011 second release on Rounder Records, the 20-year-old has composed seven of the 12 songs and it was produced by Alison Krauss & Union Station bassist Barry Bales. The album features collaborations with Bryan Sutton on guitar and Randy Kohrs on dobro. Guest singers include Dan Tyminski, Shawn Lane and Ronnie Bowman.

Features 
Hull was a guest vocalist with lead singer James Adkins on the male-female duet "Love Song", featured on the 2015 self-titled album from Americana group Big Virginia Sky.

Weighted Mind 
Released on January 29, 2016, Weighted Mind, Hull's third LP, was produced by the highly regarded banjo player Béla Fleck, who encouraged Hull to consider recording it solo. Hull, however, decided to enlist an accompanist, bassist Ethan Jodziewicz, who is featured on every track. The album also includes vocal contributions by Alison Krauss, Abigail Washburn, and Rhiannon Giddens.

NPR reviewer Jewly Hight called Weighted Mind a "stunning coming-of-age album," adding that "Hull has joined the rarefied company of Nickel Creek expats Chris Thile, Sara Watkins and Sean Watkins, pedigreed virtuosos whose youthful, searching musical minds have taken them into postmodern singer-songwriter territory and beyond."

Treasure Of The Broken Land: The Songs Of Mark Heard 
Hull contributed her cover of "Strong Hand of Love" in a Mark Heard tribute album entitled "Treasure Of The Broken Land: The Songs Of Mark Heard" (Storm Weathered Records) in 2017.

25 Trips
Released on February 28, 2020, co-produced by Hull and producer / engineer Shani Gandhi, features guitarist Mike Seal, bassist Ethan Jodziewicz, violinist Alex Hargreaves, and fiddler Christian Sedelmyer, together with bassist Viktor Krauss, guitarist Bryan Sutton, multi-instrumentalist Stuart Duncan, and steel guitarist Paul Franklin, and guest appearances by Molly Tuttle, Ron Block, Mindy Smith, Ronnie Bowman, Katie Pruitt, Angel Snow, and Hull's husband, multi-instrumentalist Justin Moses.

Liam Lewis opined, "25 Trips is an eclectic album, with a contemporary feel, showcasing Hull’s songwriting and exceptional vocals, crystal clear but with emotion and character, on 13 songs, self and co-written on the pleasures and travails of becoming the person and the musician she is today."

Hull appeared as one of the musicians on Cuttin' Grass, the 2020 bluegrass album by Sturgill Simpson.

Personal life
 
Hull married fellow bluegrass musician Justin Moses on May 14, 2017. Hull and Moses tour together. She lives in Nashville.

Discography

Albums

Other singles

Music videos

Awards and nominations

References

External links
 Official website
 

1991 births
Living people
American bluegrass mandolinists
Singer-songwriters from Tennessee
American women country singers
American country singer-songwriters
American women singer-songwriters
21st-century American singers
21st-century American women singers
Country musicians from Tennessee